Bulsara is a Gujarati surname common amongst both Parsis and Hindus, similar to Balsara, which indicates ancestry from Bulsar (Valsad). Notable people with this surname include.

Adi Bulsara (born 1951), Indian physicist
Barry George (also known as Barry Bulsara, born 1960), English murder suspect 
Baol Bardot Bulsara, vocalist for TNT (Norwegian band) 
Freddie Mercury (born Farrokh Bulsara, 1946–1991), British Indian musician born in Zanzibar
Ketan Ramanlal Bulsara, Indian-American neurosurgeon
Nina Bulsara, fictional character from Doctors
Nirupa Roy (born Kokila Kishorechandra Bulsara, 1931–2004), Indian actress
Suni Bulsara, fictional character from Doctors

References

Toponymic surnames
Indian surnames
Gujarati-language surnames
Parsi people
Hindu surnames
People from Valsad district